Viking (also known by the ship type as a prefix, Barken Viking) is a four-masted steel barque, built in 1906 by Burmeister & Wain in Copenhagen, Denmark. She is reported to be the biggest sailing ship ever built in Scandinavia. In the 21st century her sailing days have drawn to a close, and is now moored as botel in Gothenburg, Sweden.

Ship history
Viking was originally built as a sail training ship for the rapidly growing Danish merchant fleet. At that time, seaworthiness and cargo capacity were given top priority. One day in July 1909, while carrying a full cargo of wheat from Australia, Captain Niels Clausen recorded a speed record in the ship's log: . 

On 25 February 1917, she was sighted and boarded by the German commerce raider . Unusually, the Germans then allowed her to proceed because being Danish, she was a neutral ship. This was something of a lucky escape, because within weeks Germany would return to unrestricted marine warfare, a tactic that would have meant the ship's indefinite sinking.

In 1929 she was registered under the Finnish flag, and joined the Åland-based Erikson fleet of tall ships. She was part of Erikson's fleet until 1950. Viking was about to be scrapped in the late 1940s, but was eventually saved by the Swedish government in 1950 and moored in Gothenburg. A suspension bridge built in the late 1960s has effectively locked the ship in, since the masts are taller than the bridge. It is unlikely she ever will sail the open seas again.
In January 2021 she was partially demasted to be able to pass under Älvsborgsbron. Early on January 24 2021 she was towed to Falkenberg by tug boats Svitzer Thor and Svitzer Bob. 

She participated in several of the Great Grain Races from Port Victoria, South Australia to Falmouth, Cornwall. Barken Viking won the Grain Race of 1948. David James was an apprentice on her voyage around the world in 1937-38, which is described in his biography.  David Robb Muirhead  (1921-78) wrote a diary and took photos of his voyage on the Viking as a working passenger in 1948, which records are held in the State Library of South Australia.

There are only ten four-masted barques and one four-masted full-rigged ship (the Falls of Clyde) in existence, and only five of these still sail (Sedov, Kruzenshtern, Sea Cloud I, Nippon Maru II, Kaiwo Maru II). A few more are still afloat and berthed in various harbors (Peking (New York City), Moshulu (Philadelphia), Passat (Lübeck, Germany), Pommern (Mariehamn, Finland), Nippon Maru (Yokohama, Japan), and Viking).

Viking came to Gothenburg in Sweden permanently in 1950, as a home for various shipping organizations, and later became a school of seamanship. Today it is moored at Lilla Bommen as hotel "Barken Viking". The owner of the hotel  is ESS Hotell AB.

Finnish artist Lena Ringbom-Lindén, one of a few females on board a ship at that time, sailed on Viking on one of its voyages to Australia. She wrote of her experience in two books, Flicka på skepp ("Girl on Ship") and Skeppet och Lena ("Lena and The Ship").

Cargoes
Viking's cargos:
 Cement - Denmark
 Coal - Europe
 Guano - South America
 Salt - Germany (Hamburg)
 Soya beans - Russia (Vladivostok)
 Stone - Norway
 Timber - Sweden (Sundsvall)
 Wheat - Australia

See also

Grain race
Moshulu
Pommern
Tall ship
Windjammer
Gustaf Erikson
Botel

References

External links 

Official site of Barken Viking
A history in Finnish

Viking, Barque
Viking, Barque
Viking, Barque
Merchant ships of Finland
Barques
Windjammers
Training ships
Four-masted ships
Ships built in Copenhagen
1906 ships
Museums in Gothenburg
1906 in Denmark
Economic history of Denmark
World War I merchant ships of Denmark
World War II merchant ships of Finland
Economic history of Finland
Tall ships of Sweden
National symbols of Sweden
Scandinavian history